The men's 400 metre freestyle event at the 2015 European Games in Baku took place on 23 June at the Aquatic Palace.

Results

Heats
The heats were started at 10:07.

Final
The final was held at 18:21.

References

Men's 400 metre freestyle